Wuhai Airport is an airport in Wuhai, Inner Mongolia, China . It was opened in 2003.

History
Wuhai Airport was built under the 10th five-year plan. Construction of the airport cost 145 million yuan. China Daily reported in December 2003 that the airport had opened, with Hainan Airlines providing flights from Beijing.

Infrastructure
The airport is equipped with a runway with dimensions .

Airlines and destinations

See also
List of airports in the People's Republic of China

References

Airports in Inner Mongolia
Airports established in 2003
2003 establishments in China